Megathyrididae is a family of brachiopods belonging to the order Terebratulida.

Genera

Genera:
 Argiope Eudes-Deslongchamps, 1842
 Argyrotheca Dall, 1900
 Bronnothyris Popiel-Barczyk & Smirnova, 1978

References

Brachiopods